Just... Fabulous Rock 'n' Roll is a studio album by Cliff Richard, released 11 November 2016. The album was produced by Steve Mandile and recorded at the Blackbird Studio and Steve Mandile Productions.

The album continues the rock 'n' roll theme of his previous 2013 studio album The Fabulous Rock 'n' Roll Songbook. It comprises covers of 15 classic rock 'n' roll songs (2 in a medley format) and one new song, "It's Better to Dream". It features Elvis Presley in duet with Richard in "Blue Suede Shoes", and Peter Frampton is a guest artist on guitar on the John Lee Hooker cover track "Dimples". The lead single from the album is a cover of the Chuck Berry classic "Roll Over Beethoven" and for the 2016 Christmas season, "It's Better to Dream" (Christmas mix) was adapted from the original album version and released as a Christmas single.

The album reached number 4 on the UK Albums Chart and has been certified Gold for sales over 100,000 in the UK. The album reportedly has sales of 138,318 units in the UK.

Track listing

Charts and certifications

Weekly charts

Year-end charts

Certifications

References

2016 albums
Cliff Richard albums
Covers albums
British rock-and-roll albums